Lawrence Anthony "Larry" Schreiber (born August 11, 1947) is a former professional American football player who played as a running back for six seasons for the San Francisco 49ers and the Chicago Bears.

1947 births
Living people
Sportspeople from Covington, Kentucky
Players of American football from Kentucky
American football running backs
Tennessee Tech Golden Eagles football players
San Francisco 49ers players
Chicago Bears players